John Rumney (1 May 1898 – 1979) was an English footballer who played in the Football League for Bristol Rovers, Chesterfield, Hull City and Merthyr Town.

References

1898 births
1969 deaths
English footballers
Association football forwards
English Football League players
Leadgate Park F.C. players
Annfield Plain F.C. players
West Stanley F.C. players
Hull City A.F.C. players
Chesterfield F.C. players
Merthyr Town F.C. players
Bristol Rovers F.C. players
Consett A.F.C. players
Chester-le-Street Town F.C. players